Isma'iliyya may refer to:

Isma'ilism
Ismailia
Ismailia Governorate
Ismaïlia Canal

See also
Esmailiyeh (disambiguation)